Jenny Simpson is an American middle distance runner and steeplechaser.

Jenny or Jennifer Simpson may also refer to:

Jenny Simpson (singer), American country music singer
Jenny Simpson (album)
Jennifer Simpson, video game character in Clock Tower (1995 video game)
Jennie Simpson (bowls), New Zealand lawn bowler
Jennie Simpson (camogie), camogie player